Jure Pavić (born September 13, 1975) is a Croatian former footballer who played primarily as a midfielder with notable stints in the Croatian First Football League, Canadian Professional Soccer League, and the USL A-League.

Playing career 
Pavic played in the Croatian First Football League in 1995, where he would play with NK Neretva, and HNK Šibenik. In 1999, he went abroad to play in the Bayernliga with SC Weismain. He went overseas in 2003 to play in the Canadian Professional Soccer League with Toronto Croatia. The following season he signed with the Toronto Lynx of the USL A-League. He made his debut on May 28, 2004 against the Montreal Impact. In 2006, he returned to play with Toronto Croatia.

References 

1975 births
Living people
Croatian footballers
Association football midfielders
NK Neretva players
HNK Šibenik players
Toronto Croatia players
Toronto Lynx players
First Football League (Croatia) players
Croatian Football League players
Landesliga players
A-League (1995–2004) players
Canadian Soccer League (1998–present) players
Croatian expatriate footballers
Expatriate footballers in Germany
Croatian expatriate sportspeople in Germany
Expatriate soccer players in Canada
Croatian expatriate sportspeople in Canada